Count Aleksander Nikolayevich Samoylov (1744 – 1 November 1814) was a Russian general and statesman.

Alexander Samoylov was born into the family of senator Nikolay Samoylov. He started his military service in 1760 as a soldier of Leib-Guard Semyonovsky Regiment. Later he was moved to the frontline forces and took part in the Russo-Turkish War, 1768–1774 and, for his part in the taking of Silistra, received the Order of St. George of 4th degree.

The rise to power of his relative Prince Potemkin led to a comital title being bestowed upon Samoilov in 1775. After that, he obtained quick promotion: in 1775 he was appointed a member of commission for the trial of Yemelyan Pugachev. Also he was promoted to kamer-yunker (cadet) and became the chairman of the State Council of Imperial Russia, which existed in the reign of Catherine II in 1776–1787. In 1783 he commanded the Crimean Chasseur Corps and was prominent in the campaign that led to the Russian annexation of the Crimean Khanate.

He was Lieutenant-General during the Russo-Turkish War, 1787–1792 , commanding five infantry regiments, two corps of chasseurs, seven Cossack regiments, and forty cannons. In 1788, he distinguished himself in the taking of Ochakov and was awarded the Order of St. George of 2nd degree. In 1789 he took part in the taking of Bendery and Kaushan, serving under Prince Potemkin. He received the Order of Alexander Nevsky for that campaign. On 12 December 1790, he commanded the left wing of the army of Alexander Suvorov in the storm of Izmail and was awarded the Order of St. Vladimir of 1st degree.

For his efforts in bringing about the peace treaty with the Ottoman Empire, Catherine II personally decorated him with the Order of St. Andrew. On 17 September 1792, he was appointed Prosecutor General of Russia of the  Senate, replacing the seriously ill prince Alexander Vyazemsky. Upon his accession to the throne, emperor Paul I dismissed Samoylov.

Alexander Samoilov married princess Troubetzkoy and had one son, Nicholas, who did not leave issue from his marriage to Countess Yuliya Skavronsky. General Raevsky was his nephew.

External links
 
  Biography at the Official site of the Office of Public Prosecutor

Russian nobility
Russian generals
1744 births
1814 deaths
Recipients of the Order of St. George of the Second Degree
Recipients of the Order of the White Eagle (Poland)